Reedsville is an unincorporated community in Wayne Township in Schuylkill County, Pennsylvania, United States. Reedsville is located at the intersection of Pennsylvania Route 183 and Lutz Valley Road.

References

Unincorporated communities in Schuylkill County, Pennsylvania
Unincorporated communities in Pennsylvania